CESI, formerly Centre des études supérieures industrielles, is a French graduate engineering school created in 1958.

Its headquarters are in Nanterre close to Paris and it is located in 29 campuses in France, Spain, Algeria and Cameroun.

The College is member of the Union of Independent Grandes Écoles.

History 
CESI and its engineering school, EI.CESI, were created in 1958 by five industrial groups: SNECMA (now Safran Aircraft Engines), Renault, Télémécanique, Chausson and CEM, in order to deal with for the shortage of production engineers in France and to enable their senior Technicians and Supervisors to upgrade with a Master's degree. At the beginning, CESI was called Centre Interentreprises de Formation (CIF). In 1960, the first 24 CESI engineers graduated from the College, having been admitted to the program two years earlier as Supervisors or Technicians.

In 1969, the center launched its first inter-company training course, entitled Accompagnement du passage au statut de cadre, in order to facilitate access to new positions and employee mobility within the company.

Since 1978, CESI has been accredited by the Commission des titres d'ingénieur (CTI) to deliver the CESI engineering Master diploma. Then in 1989, CESI opened its first engineering training course with a dual education system. It was the first school to offer apprenticeships in higher education in France. In 1998, it offered its first training courses for senior Technicians.

In 2006, CESI created its research laboratory: the Laboratoire d’innovation numérique pour les entreprises et les apprentissages au service de la compétitivité des territoires (LINEACT).

In 2018, CESI became a member of the Hesam University.

Bibliography 
 Florence Baptiste & Philippe Bernoux, Les ingénieurs CESI, 1990
 Richard Lick, Mémoire de la formation histoire du cesi, ISBN 978-2911653001, 1996

References

External links 
 

Engineering universities and colleges in France
Grandes écoles